Chinami (written: 千奈美, 智奈美, 知那美 or ちなみ in hiragana) is a feminine Japanese given name. Notable people with the name include:

, Japanese voice actress
, Japanese voice actress
, Japanese politician
, Japanese model
, Japanese singer and idol
, Japanese curler

Fictional character
, a character in the light novel series Golden Time

Japanese feminine given names